Billy Meeske (b. 1891-deceased) was an Australian professional wrestler who was three-time Australian Heavyweight Champion and one time Pacific Coast Light Heavyweight Champion.

He was an active professional wrestler from 1922 to 1938, and he was credited as being a major influence in re-establishing professional wrestling in Australia following the First World War. During his professional wrestling career he also performed as part of vaudeville acts demonstrating feats of strength, such as supporting the weight of five men, feats of agility, and Russian dancing.

While he achieved his greatest fame in professional wrestling he was also an all-round sportsman competing in many sports at the amateur and professional levels, and served in the Australian Imperial Force during the First World War with the rank of Sergeant.

Biography

Early life
Meeske was born in South Melbourne, Victoria, to Australian born parents and he would later claim to be 'purebred' Australian with the exception of one of his grandfather's grandfathers being Russian. He achieved renown as an all-round athlete in his youth, particularly for cycling, wrestling, heavyweight lifting, swimming, gymnastics, and as a motorcyclist.

In 1903 he enrolled in the wrestling school of Weber and Rice. In 1907 he began cycling professionally, however in 1910 he decided he wished to compete in amateur events and was required to stand down from athletic competitions for one year in order to qualify for them. He began competing in amateur wrestling after his hiatus and became the Australian middleweight champion, holding the title from 1912 to 1914. He returned to professionalism in 1915 by becoming a professional wrestler and in April he wrestled as part of an athletic program during an event to raise money for Belgium in Melbourne, and in October he wrestled on a Police Charity Carnival program.

Military service
In November 1915 he enlisted in the Australian Imperial Force due to the First World War. At the time of his enlistment he was married to May J. Meeske. During his training he was appointed physical instructor to the Royal Park Camp and began training for boxing. He showed an aptitude for boxing and in July 1916 he sparred with twenty men in one evening at the Royal Park Camp. He was valued for his ability as a physical trainer and as such his superiors were reluctant to deploy him however he wished to serve at the front and was finally deployed with the Railway Unit in early 1917. He wrestled a Russian soldier during the voyage to the front, and while boxing competitions took place during the voyage Meeske was banned from participating due to his skill.

As of November 1917 he was serving as a sapper in Belgium, and boxed against fellow soldiers while on active service there. As of 1918 he was in France and serving on the physical training staff of a convalescent camp, and wrestled in a competition between Australian, American, Canadian, English, and Belgian soldiers in 1918, and judged a boxing competition in 1919. During his time deployed in France he had eighteen boxing matches winning seventeen and drawing one and defeated former French wrestling champion M. Pernin in a wrestling match.

First reign as Heavyweight Champion of Australia
Meeske was back in Australia in 1920 and became an instructor at the Victorian Railways Institute and at some point became physical instructor for the Essendon Football Club. In February he directed an athletic program during which he demonstrated Russian Dance, Ju-Jitsu, and weight lifting. In April he issued a challenge wagering twenty pounds that no light heavyweight wrestler in Australia could beat him in a catch-as-catch-can style best of three falls match. As of September 1920 it was being suggested that he may have a superior physique to respected wrestler Clarence Weber, and he challenged Weber to put the heavy-weight championship on the line, but later learnt that Weber had officially retired in 1913 and as such claimed to be the Australian heavyweight champion and stated that he was willing to defend the title against any challenger including Weber. Weber declined to wrestle Meeske unless he was paid one hundred pounds, and in 1921 it was suggested that there were no worthy opponents for Meeske in Australia. In August 1921 he wrestled his first match after the war defeating Billy Tonkin.

In January 1922 Meeske had a Ju-Jitsu match against Billy McGarvey. Professional wrestling was described as having almost lapsed out of existence in Australia as of 1922, and in late January the company Country Stadiums Ltd. moved to reinvigorate the sport organizing for Meeske to wrestle Billy Kopsch under their auspices in March. Victorian wrestler, Bert Potts, challenged Meeske for the Australian championship before Meeske had wrestled Kopsch. As the scheduled date approached Meeske delayed the match by a fortnight, but by April it had still not taken place, with Kopsch stating he had not heard any news regarding it. As of July 1922 Meeske was still claiming the heavyweight championship and giving wrestling demonstrations with Billy Tonkin, and in July he issued a challenge claiming he was able to throw any twelve wrestlers in Australia within an hour.

In August 1922 a meeting of all professional wrestlers in Victoria was held to reinvigorate the sport and resolve the issue of scheduled matches falling through. At the meeting it was decided that the two wrestlers with the best claim to the heavyweight championship of Australia were Joe Bailey and Meeske and a match was scheduled. In September 1922 to promote the match Meeske antagonized Bailey by having ten pounds delivered to him via the newspaper the Sporting Globe as a wager and suggesting that Bailey may not show due to cowardice. He later sent an additional fifteen pounds to Bailey saying he would wrestle him at any time and any location with ten days notice. Meeske finally wrestled for the heavyweight championship against Bailey on November 22 at Melbourne Stadium, defeating him and becoming the recognized heavyweight champion of Australia. After his victory he went on holiday to Gippsland Lakes.

In January 1923 Meeske agreed to face Dave Smith for the heavyweight title in February, and announced that he would defend the title against Billy Kopsch if he defeated Smith ahead of the match. He defeated Smith with the victory being described as easy, and decisive with the match lasting just three minutes. Meeske's manager demanded that Kopsch wager twenty-five pounds ahead of their match, accusing him of not drawing large enough crowds to his matches, and Meeske instead wrestled and defeated Scotsman Jim McMurdo in April 1923. Another notable event in April was that Meeske joined the coaching staff of the South Melbourne Football Club.

In May, 1923, Kopsch challenged Meeske again, and they finally wrestled on May 31 with Meeske winning after Kopsche sustained a shoulder injury he claimed seriously handicapped him. They wrestled a second time in June with Meeske winning again. After this a match between Meeske and Clarence Weber, who had recently come out of retirement, was hotly anticipated but Meeske postponed scheduling a bout due to his commitments with the South Melbourne Football Club, although he did wrestle and beat Charlie Honroths in late June. In July the date of a Meeske and Weber wrestling match was set, and the prospect received interest throughout the month. In early August Meeske won a Ju-Jitsu match against Billy Kopsch which was billed as a 'fight to the death' due to strangle holds being allowed. They fought a second Ju-Jitsu match with the stipulation that they wear jackets in late August which Meeske also won.

In late August Weber and Meeske participated in vaudeville acts to promote their match, demonstrating feats of strength, and they finally wrestled on 1 September 1923 before a crowd reported to be from 8,000 to 9,000 strong with Weber dominating the match and winning the championship. Meeske claimed to have been hampered by injuring his knee during training, and limped from the ring,  but declined to release a medical certificate due to 'medical etiquette'. Shortly after the match he offered to wager one hundred pounds that he could defeat Weber in a fair fight.

Cruiserweight champion
After losing the championship Meeske performed at a local concerts across Victoria, performing demonstrations of feats of strength and agility and Russian dancing. He also gave wrestling exhibitions in Melbourne alongside Weber, and their joint promotional work was credited with greatly increasing the popularity of professional wrestling in Melbourne.

In November 1923 Meeske announced his knee had recovered and he was ready to wrestle again, and a match against Jim McMurdo was scheduled for the cruiserweight championship with Meeske describing it as a chance to have "another chance at Weber." Meeske spoke positively about McMurdo's skill prior to the match, which took place in December and was described as an even contest which Meeske won with some cheating. A notable spot in the match was Meeske being thrown out of the ring and landing on a reporter.

In January 1924 Meeske and McMurdo were scheduled to wrestle again but McMurdo was injured causing the match to be canceled. In February Meeske wrestled Charles Honroth instead in a match which Meeske won, but was criticized for being slow paced. Meeske then accused Weber of avoiding a match against him, and reiterated that he felt he had only lost due to his leg injury. In March 1924 Meeske was scheduled to fight Peter Fatouras, a Greek wrestler, in his debut in a challenge match in which he had to throw Fatouras out of the ring twice. He claimed to have cut open his hand on a kerosene tin full of soap ahead of the match, which was postponed as Meeske was booked to wrestle the visiting American wrestler Walter Miller after Weber pulled out of a match against him. The bout was promoted as being a test of the standard of Australian wrestling relative to America, and a test of whether Meeske deserved to challenge for the world championship. Miller defeated Meeske, badly injuring his shoulder in the finish resulting in tension between both wrestlers camps, Meeske demonstrating discontent with his own team for throwing in the towel after his injury, and Miller being heckled as he left the ring.

In late May 1924 Meeske expressed that he wanted a no-rules rematch with Walter Miller before he returned to America and then a title match against Weber. The Miller-Meeske rematch took place in June and was evenly matched going the distance with Miller winning on points to the crowds dismay, although there was a lack of heat for the match and attendance was poor. Meeske almost immediately issued a challenge for a second rematch wagering two hundred pounds that he could beat Miller, and it was suggested that a rematch may decide the heavyweight championship, as Miller had beaten reigning champion Clarence Weber, however it was determined that as Miller had not lived in Australia for six months before beating Weber he could not qualify as champion and the match did not go ahead. Miller invited Meeske to come to America with him when he departed Australia.

In October 1924 Meeske visited Brisbane, Queensland, to assist a team of amateur boxers and wrestlers and during his time there he trained for a match against Peter Limutkin. The Limutkin match was scheduled to take place in Sydney, New South Wales, and was the first major professional wrestling event in the city since before the war began, and the first time Meeske had wrestled in Sydney. It was organized as a result of the success of professional wrestling events involving Walter Miller in Melbourne. To promote the match both wrestlers gave training displays at the stadium where it was going to take place in late October. The match took place in late October and was attended by an estimated 2,000 or 3,000 people, which Meeske regarded as less than he expected, although he felt there was potential for professional wrestling to gain popularity. It went the full rounds with Meeske winning by decision although a doctor determining Limutkin had fractured a rib during it. Meeske went on holiday to the Blue Mountains after the match before returning to Melbourne in November and beginning to train to face Weber.

American light-heavy champion wrestler Ted Thye visited Australia in late 1924 and Meeske was scheduled to wrestle him in Sydney in December although he needed to secure leave of absence from his position with Victorian Railways to make the trip. Thye won the match using a toehold and forcing Meeske to tapout. The match impressed a manager to the extent that they immediately arranged a rematch, suggesting that as Meeske was Australian cruiserweight champion and Thye was American cruiserweight champion it could be billed as a world championship match, although a report did note that there was not a full house in attendance. When he returned to Melbourne after the match Meeske told reporters there was no ill will between him and Thye, noting that they had soaped each others backs in the showers after the bout. In late December Thye and Meeske wrestled in Sydney a second time and went for the full eight rounds with the match being called a draw on points. The second match was also poorly attended resulting in the future of professional wrestling in Sydney being questioned. 

In January 1925 Meeske lost to Al Karasik in Melbourne in a wrestling match which devolved into a brawl with a dozen men reportedly being required to separate them to end the match. In late January Weber announced he was ready to wrestle Meeske in a championship bout, however Meeske responded that he was already making preparations to participate in a cruiserweight world championship and have a rematch with Karasick to prepare and would have to wait until after the championship to wrestle Weber, and noted that he had challenged Weber several times in the past year with no response. Weber retorted that Meeske had also kept him waiting for several months before their first championship match. In February Meeske challenged Karasick to a rematch, stating he had developed a counter to his headholds.

In March Walter Miller returned to Australia and Meeske was scheduled to be his first opponent, however Stadiums Ltd. instead booked Karasick to face Miller, resulting in Meeske expressing that he had been treated unfairly by the company, and as such he expressed his intention to move to America after wrestling Bill Dutton, who had challenged him in January, and issuing a challenge to Peter Limutkin or Sam Burmeister. A media report on Meeske's comments noted that he had been overlooked by promoters in recent years who were favoring visiting wrestlers from overseas, causing the careers of Australian wrestlers like Meeske to be neglected and the professional wrestling scene overall to slump when the visitor left the country. On March 29 Meeske beat Dutton in Wollongong, and in April he secured a match against Sam Burmeister who threatened to crush Meeske's shoulders into the canvas ahead of the bout, however Meeske won the match which was described as a poor exhibition.

Meeske did not follow through on his threat to leave the country after wrestling Burmeister as Walter Miller had issued a general challenge to all Australian wrestlers which he intended to accept, and in preparation he renewed his challenge to Karasick. In May 1925 he secured publicity by challenging Karasick in person at a match between Thye and Karasick which was accepted, however he was ultimately booked to face Miller instead in late May and outscored Miller on points, but lost due to being pinned. In August 1925 he won a match against Indian wrestler Mahomet Ali Sunni, and lost against American wrestler James O'Connell, who was billed as the welter and middle-weight world champion. As of September Meeske was again planning to go to America, but late in the month he wrestled Sam Burmister again, this time in Adelaide in the first professional wrestling event in the city for many years which Meeske won, although it was noticed that Burmister only made aggressive maneuvers twice in the match, allowing Meeske to attack for the majority of the time. He was scheduled to wrestle Karasick again in October, but Karasick reported he was unfit on the scheduled date.

Wrestling abroad
In October 1925 Meeske departed Australia for America with his wife on the ship Aorangi, and he was fare-welled by colleagues of the Railways Institute at an evening in his honor and given a travel rug by the South Melbourne Football Club upon his departure. En route to America Meeske visited New Zealand and won two wrestling matches, against a Brown and Simpson, in Auckland. Meeske first arrived in Vancouver, staying for two days, before travelling on to Chicago through Seattle and Portland. As of November 1925 he had settled in Sioux City, Iowa, and won three wrestling matches there, and despite his absence from the country he was still being reported as the Australian cruiserweight champion. In December he beat Vladimir Kuzmak.

By January 1926 Meeske had moved to Chicago where he signed with the promoter Ed White for six matches and began training with Strangler Lewis, and he defeated Mike Yokel for the Pacific Coast Light Heavyweight Championship (billed as the world light heavy-weight belt) that month. By February he had defeated Ralph Hands, billed as champion of San Francisco, and August Burch, billed as champion of Salt Lake City. In early February he beat Ralph Hands in a rematch and also beat Al Karasick who was also in America. On 18 February 1926 he had his first loss in America to Billy Edwards in a match in Portland, dropping the Pacific Coast Light Heavyweight championship, due to kicking Edwards in the chin during the bout which he claimed was an accident. His wrestling schedule was becoming busier and in late February he defeated Ralph Hands a third time and Frank Pilling in the same week he lost to Edwards. He lost a rematch to Edwards before the close of February, and in early March he lost to Karasick.

In total Meeske wrestled twenty-eight matches and won twenty-six of them while in America. He noted that American wrestling audiences were very hostile to him as a foreigner, and after one match he assaulted a fan who was abusing him as he left the ring and was pursued by police, but after explaining the situation he was not arrested, although on another occasion he claimed a local chief of police threatened to run him out of town. In one match a fan invaded the ring to interfere and drew a gun when Meeske hit him, but was swiftly rushed by several people and disarmed.

Sydney Stadiums Ltd. organized for several wrestlers, including Meeske, to come to Australia from America to wrestle in March 1926. His successful run in America was noted as an indication he would be an even competitor with the rest of the touring wrestlers. He visited New Zealand before arriving back in Australia, and wrestled H. Anderson, the New Zealand light-heavyweight champion, three times winning twice and losing once.

Pursuit of the Heavyweight Championship
He arrived back in Melbourne on 22 April 1926 and resumed employment with Victorian Railways and as a trainer with the South Melbourne Football Club. In May he made a public appearance at Melbourne Stadium and received a large ovation. He wrestled his first match after returning against the American Mike Yokel on May 16 in what was described as one of the cruelest and roughest wrestling matches ever seen in Melbourne, with moves becoming gradually more extreme until Yokel appeared to render Meeske unconscious and began celebrating before being disqualified. The American 'rough-house' style was not well received by audiences and Meeske adopted more conventional wrestling in a match against Martin Ludecke the following week, which he lost. In June a boxing committee attempted to have Meeske come to Broken Hill to wrestle, but he responded that he was under contract with Stadium Ltd. for a few more matches.

By the end of June a title match between Meeske and the reigning heavyweight champion Clarence Weber had been scheduled for July 10, and there was an immediate heavy demand for bookings. Emphasis was placed on the fact Meeske had improved from their last bout by enhancing his technique in America in the leadup to the match, although general sentiment was reportedly that Weber would retain the title. The two wrestlers attracted a large crowd just for a demonstration session in which they demonstrated wrestling holds ahead of the match. They wrestled on July 11 and it was an even match until Meeske was disqualified for knocking Weber out with a punch to the jaw after which Weber's camp invaded the ring and Meeske was heckled as he fled to his dressing room protected by several police constables, with Weber receiving loud cheers when he came to. After the match Meeske claimed the blow was accidental and said he would wrestle Weber again any time. The crowd reaction to the Weber-Meeske match was described as unprecedented and prompted the manager of the stadium where the match took place to launch an inquiry, during which fellow wrestlers Mike Yokel and Martin Ludecke explained that such blows easily occur in wrestling by accident, with Yokel showing injuries to prove it. Weber also stated that Meeske had apologized to him and asked for leniency. It was concluded that Meeske could retain his share of the gate money, with the manager of Stadiums Ltd. publicly warning Meeske to avoid roughness in future.

In early August Meeske made an appearance at ringside at a match between Sam Clapham, a British wrestler billed as the British Empire champion, and Ted Thye in Melbourne. In late August Meeske denied that Clapham was the best wrestler in the British Empire and challenged him to a match to prove it, however ultimately no match took place. He was training wrestlers as of 1926 and in late August he gave an exhibition with his students at a carnival in Northcote. By September the Weber rematch had been scheduled, which took place on September 18. Despite crowd expectations of rough behavior Meeske beat Weber cleanly with conventional wrestling to become Heavyweight Champion of Australia for the second time in his career. The match was noted as lacking the animosity that had come to characterize recent high profile wrestling matches, being completely clean.

Second reign as Heavyweight Champion
Meeske retained the cruiserweight championship of Australia after becoming heavyweight champion, and as such calls for him to wrestle Sam Clapham, who by this time was being billed as the world cruiserweight championship, continued throughout October 1926, however Clapham's schedule was already full up until he was to depart the country making it impossible to schedule a bout.

In early October 1926 Meeske wrestled Mike Yokel and lost after retiring due to being thrown out of the ring onto the steps and then the stone floor, which did not cause a change in the heavyweight title as Yokel did not qualify as an Australian. Weber challenged Meeske for another shot at the heavyweight title late in November and it was suggested a rematch could take place before the end of the year, however Meeske wrestled Yokel a second time instead to close the year's wrestling season in an 'all-in' match in which ju-jitsu holds were allowed.

Meeske wrestled Con Keatos in a demonstration to promote the Yokel match, which took place in early November 1926 and was won by Yokel, with one spot featuring Yokel pointing to Meeske's trunks to imply they were falling and tackling him when he looked. During the match the referees shirt was ripped off when he tried to separate the fighters and Meeske tackled the referee once and threw Yokel out of the ring several times reflecting the 'all-in' nature of the match. The match was well-attended and a rematch was swiftly organized for the following week, shortly before Yokel was to return to America, and tickets to the rematch sold well. Yokel beat Meeske again in the match which was well-received by the crowd, but some felt it incorporated too much ju-jitsu at the expense of wrestling holds which was a criticism leveled at the direction professional wrestling had taken in general over the year. In December Peter Limutkin challenged Meeske to a match.

In April 1927 Meeske opened his year by wrestling Canadian champion Billy Edwards, billed as the roughest wrestler in the world, and lost by appearing to be rendered unconscious by a headlock and carried from the ring. The match was 'all-in' featuring biting, gouging, and assault of the referee from Edwards, however Meeske wrestled cleanly. In late May Meeske wrestled Ted Thye and lost due to being pinned, and while the match impressed some critics its clean nature and lack of brutality bored spectators.

In June 1927 Clarence Weber accused Meeske of ignoring his challenge despite agreeing to defend the title against him in January, and announced that if Meeske did not respond in fourteen days he would claim the heavyweight title for himself by default, which prompted Meeske to agree to schedule a bout. They wrestled in August and the match went the full rounds and was drawn on points with Meeske retaining the title, however the match was of very low quality with the lack of athleticism, particularly due to Weber's age, making spectators suspect that the contest was staged and it was suggested that the match may lead to a collapse in professional wrestling in Melbourne. In September Meeske made acrobatic vaudeville appearances and it was suggested that he could make a career outside of wrestling as an entertainer.

In October 1927 Meeske wrestled John Kilonis in Melbourne and won after Kilonis was disqualified for kicking him in the face and throwing him out of the ring. After the disqualification Meeske and Kilonis fought an impromptu boxing match which resulted in Kilonis being knocked out of the ring onto the press seats, however it was observed that he was sent out of the ring by a light tap and the match was described as "a huge joke", although it was also reported it received a positive reaction from the audience. Before the end of the month they fought a mixed boxing/wrestling rematch with Kilonis winning the wrestling match and Meeske winning the boxing bout but punching Kilonis after receiving the decision resulting in a short scuffle.

A Speaker
On 27 February 1927, Billy Meeske appeared as part of the opening program for new Melbourne radio station 3DB. Interspersed between various musicians, and a recitation from Shakespeare, Meeske spoke about "Wrestlers I Have Known".

Championships and accomplishments
Professional wrestling
Australian Heavyweight Championship (3 times)
Australian Cruiserweight Championship (1 time)
Australian Light Heavyweight Championship (1 time)
British Empire/Commonwealth Heavyweight Championship (1 time)

References

1891 births
Sportspeople from Melbourne
Sportsmen from Victoria (Australia)
Australian male professional wrestlers
Australian male sport wrestlers
Australian jujutsuka
Australian exercise instructors
Australian male boxers
Vaudeville performers
Year of death missing